Media was an American electric automobile built in 1899 and 1900 in Media, Pennsylvania.

History 
Media Carriage Works, established in 1895 built to order an electric runabout on 1899. The company decided to enter series production and made arrangements with the Pullen Battery & Electrical Manufacturing Company of Philadelphia.

The Pullen battery was used in the Media, a 900-pound runabout.  Media offered versions of this vehicle for sale at $1,100 in 1900. The Media had a running range of thirty-five miles on a single charge and a top speed of 12 mph . Media Carriage Works may have built occasional Media's after 1900, but returned to the carriage trade.

References

Defunct motor vehicle manufacturers of the United States
Veteran vehicles
1890s cars
1900s cars
Electric vehicle manufacturers of the United States
Electric vehicles
Motor vehicle manufacturers based in Pennsylvania
Coachbuilders of the United States
Cars introduced in 1899